The Girl in the News is a 1940 British thriller film directed by Carol Reed and starring Margaret Lockwood, Barry K. Barnes and Emlyn Williams. It was based on the eponymous novel by Roy Vickers, released the same year.

Plot
After her elderly patient is poisoned, nurse Anne Graham is tried for murder, but is acquitted with the help of her lawyer, Stephen Farringdon. The press and public opinion are still against her, so Anne finds it difficult to get another job. She changes her name and finds work nursing wheelchair user Edward Bentley. After Bentley too is found dead, Bill Mather, a detective from Scotland Yard, arrests Anne, but Farringdon fights once again to prove her innocence.

Cast
 Margaret Lockwood as Anne Graham
 Barry K. Barnes as Stephen Farringdon
 Emlyn Williams as Tracy
 Roger Livesey as Bill Mather
 Margaretta Scott as Judith Bentley
 Wyndham Goldie as Edward Bentley
 Basil Radford as Doctor Threadgrove
 Irene Handl as Gertrude Mary Blaker
 Mervyn Johns as James Fetherwood
 Betty Jardine as Elsie
 Kathleen Harrison as Cook
 Felix Aylmer as Prosecuting Counsel

Production
The film was based on a bestselling novel by Roy Vickers. It was the first of several collaborations between the director Carol Reed and the writer Sidney Gilliat. Gilliat later recalled:
He [Reed] seemed to be an interpreter rather than a creator; he followed the screenplay quite closely rather than bringing forth original ideas of his own. I felt he was not at all interested in The Girl in the News, which I think was a pallid job. The chief obstacle was Carol's stage background - the couldn't really believe in the screenwriter. He needed close collaboration with a writer.
Gilliat also claimed Reed avoided the "sexual implications" in the script until it "became postively genteel."

The film was originally meant to star Margaret Lockwood and Michael Redgrave, who had just appeared together in The Lady Vanishes. It was one of several films Lockwood made with Reed.

It marks the film debut of Michael Hordern, who has one line, during a court scene, as a junior counsel to the senior counsel played by Felix Aylmer.

Critical reception
On the film's initial release the reviewer for The New York Times wrote, "bring out the smelling salts, folks. Another spellbinding English thriller has come to town!" More recently the Radio Times called the film a "workmanlike if rather transparent murder mystery"; and Allmovie wrote: "this early Carol Reed effort tended to be dismissed or ignored by its director in later interviews. Even so, the film is a worthwhile effort, with an intricate and sometimes amusing script by Sydney Gilliat."

Radio adaptation
The Girl in the News was presented on Philip Morris Playhouse 21 November 1941. The adaptation starred Joan Bennett.

References

External links

Girl in the News at TCMDB
The Girl in the News at British Film Institute
The Girl in the News at Britmovie
Review of film at Variety

1940 films
1940s thriller films
Films directed by Carol Reed
Metro-Goldwyn-Mayer films
20th Century Fox films
British black-and-white films
Films set in London
British thriller films
1940s English-language films
1940s British films